The Pine Valley Covered Bridge, also known as the Iron Hill Bridge, is a historic wooden covered bridge located in New Britain Borough, near Doylestown in Bucks County, Pennsylvania.  It crosses Pine Run Creek near Peace Valley Park.

This town truss bridge, which measures  in length, was built by David Sutton in 1842 at a cost of $5553.50. That amount is equal to $ today.

Posted for years with a height restriction of 11'6" (3.5 meters), it was reposted in 2007 to 9'4" (2.85 meters) after an overheight truck passed through it and damaged the roof.

It was added to the National Register of Historic Places on December 1, 1980.

References

Covered bridges in Bucks County, Pennsylvania
Covered bridges on the National Register of Historic Places in Pennsylvania
Wooden bridges in Pennsylvania
Bridges completed in 1842
Bridges in Bucks County, Pennsylvania
Tourist attractions in Bucks County, Pennsylvania
National Register of Historic Places in Bucks County, Pennsylvania
Road bridges on the National Register of Historic Places in Pennsylvania
1842 establishments in Pennsylvania
Lattice truss bridges in the United States